is a Japanese politician of the Constitutional Democratic Party of Japan and a former member of the House of Representatives in the Diet (national legislature). He is a native of Katsuragi, Wakayama and he started working for Panasonic Corporation in 1971 after graduating from Chuo University. He was elected to the House of Representatives for the first time in 1996 as an independent. He was the Chief Cabinet Secretary in the Yukio Hatoyama administration.  He represented the 11th District of Osaka Prefecture from 1996 until 2012, and again from 2014 to 2021.

References

External links 
  in Japanese.

1949 births
Living people
People from Wakayama Prefecture
Chuo University alumni
Panasonic
Members of the House of Representatives (Japan)
Government ministers of Japan
Democratic Party of Japan politicians
Noda cabinet
21st-century Japanese politicians
Culture ministers of Japan
Education ministers of Japan
Science ministers of Japan
Sports ministers of Japan
Technology ministers of Japan